The 2002 FIFA U-19 Women's World Championship was held from 17 August to 1 September. It was the first sanctioned youth tournament for women put together by FIFA. The tournament was hosted by Canada.  FIFA granted the tournament to Canada in March 2001. Three cities hosted the tournament, Edmonton, Vancouver, and Victoria. Canada's Christine Sinclair won the Golden Ball as the tournament's best player and the Golden Shoe as top-scorer.

Squads

Qualified teams

Group stage

Group A

Group B

Group C

Knockout Round 

All times local.

Quarterfinals

Semifinals

3rd Place Playoff

Final

ASDET – after sudden death extra time 
PSO – penalty shootout

Awards

The following awards were given for the tournament:

All star team

Scorers
11 goals
 Christine Sinclair

9 goals
 Kelly Wilson

6 goals
 Marta
 Lindsay Tarpley

4 goals
 Heather O'Reilly

3 goals

 Hayley Crawford
 Daniela
 Kelly
 Kara Lang
 Johanna Rasmussen
 Linda Bresonik
 Anja Mittag
 Shinobu Ohno
 Guadalupe Worbis

2 goals

 Cristiane
 Ellen Maggs
 Katy Ward
 Leslie Osborne

1 goal

 Catherine Cannuli
 Lana Harch
 Selin Kuralay
 Amber Neilson
 Karla Reuter
 Renata Costa
 Tatiana
 Michelle Rowe
 Clare Rustad
 Katie Thorlakson
 Sandra Jensen
 Marie Stentoft-Herping
 Michelle Hickmott
 Emily Westwood
 Camille Abily
 Elodie Ramos
 Isabell Bachor
 Annelie Brendel
 Barbara Müller
 Akiko Sudo
 Lisette Martinez
 Michell Rico
 Akudo Iwuagwu
 Olushola Oyewusi
 Lu Yen-Ling
 Rachel Buehler
 Stephanie Ebner
 Kerri Hanks
 Megan Kakadelas
 Jill Oakes

References

External links
FIFA U-19 Women's World Championship Canada 2002, FIFA.com
FIFA Technical Report (Part 1) and (Part 2)

FIFA
FIFA
FIFA U-20 Women's World Cup tournaments
International women's association football competitions hosted by Canada
Soccer in Edmonton
Soccer in Alberta
Soccer in British Columbia
August 2002 sports events in Canada
September 2002 sports events in Canada
2002 in youth association football